(),  or  is a word meaning "welcome".

This word appears in the Irish phrase  (a hundred thousand welcomes) as well as the similar Scottish phrase  and the Manx .  It also occurs in the name of Fáilte Ireland and its predecessor organization, Bord Fáilte (Board of Welcome).  Fáilte Towers, an RTÉ reality programme broadcast in Ireland in 2008, incorporates this word in its name as well.

References

Greeting words and phrases
Irish words and phrases